is a Japanese actress, model, and gravure idol who is affiliated with Horipro.

Biography
Before becoming an actress, Sano was a magazine model. She appeared in the photo collection Hare Nochi Tsuintēru, and served as a model in After School Tails. She was nominated in the Horipro Scout Caravan 2012 contest. Although Sano missed the Grand Prix, she was associated with Horipro.

In March 2013, she graduated from Tama University Meguro High School. In April, Sano went on to attend a university.

On July 13, 2013, she appeared in Weekly Young Magazine (Kodansha) which marked her debut in gravure.  In August 2014, Sano became an exclusive Beauty Muse of Vivi.

Filmography

TV series

References

External links
 Official profile at Horipro  
 
 

21st-century Japanese actresses
Japanese female models
Japanese gravure models
Japanese television personalities
1994 births
Living people
People from Tokyo
Models from Tokyo Metropolis